Hounslow railway station, on the Hounslow Loop Line, is in the London Borough of Hounslow, in Greater London, and is in Travelcard Zone 5. The station and all trains serving it are operated by South Western Railway.

History
The London and South Western Railway opened the calling point on 1 February 1850 on completion of the bridges and embankments at Isleworth station. A temporary station had opened as "Hounslow" 400 metres northeast of the present  station on 22 August 1849 to allow a service to run until the loop was connected and the line complete. After this point the main commercial businesses of Hounslow and landmark buildings moved westward along Staines Road, Hounslow's fledgling high street and a major then-artery serving London and the south-west to reflect the new position of the railway station serving the nascent town.  The Victoria County History series local historian Susan Reynolds, in 1962, noted  A resident station master was installed at the replacement Hounslow station in the early years and ceased to occupy the station house in the mid 20th century.

A total of £650,000 was spent for alterations over four months in the early 2010s including a larger booking hall and toilet, access for people with disabilities and low-energy, semi-automated lighting.

Services 

The typical off-peak service from the station in trains per hour is:
 4 direct to Waterloo via 
 2 circuitously to Waterloo via  and Richmond

On Sundays two trains per hour run to and from Waterloo, one of which continues to Woking and the other to Whitton, Twickenham and following stops back to London Waterloo including Richmond.

Station amenities and setting
London Buses route 281 serves the station.  The town centre of Hounslow is 400m north of the station.  The station has seating areas and a shop.

Service expansion schemes
Two early 21st century proposals short of central government pledge stage, or Network Rail proposals, exist for the Hounslow Loop Line, further details of which are mentioned at Syon Lane.

In 2017 a proposal to extend the London Overground network to Hounslow was announced by the London Assembly and Transport for London. The plans are currently at public consultation stage with TfL.

In popular culture
The station was featured in the music video for the 1982 Depeche Mode song See You.
The line "Jeffrey, take the 9pm to Hounslow out of your mouth" is stated by character Stewie Griffin in the Family Guy episode "Dammit Janet!" (2000).

References

External links 

Railway stations in the London Borough of Hounslow
Former London and South Western Railway stations
Railway stations in Great Britain opened in 1850
Railway stations served by South Western Railway